Carles Mas Bacardit (born 27 February 1993) is a Spanish professional footballer who plays as a centre-back for Olot.

Club career
Born in Banyoles, Girona, Catalonia, Mas graduated from Girona FC's youth setup. He made his senior debuts with the reserves in the regional leagues, in the 2012–13 campaign.

On 8 June 2013, Mas played his first match as a professional, starting in a 1–1 home draw against Real Madrid Castilla in the Segunda División championship. He scored his first professional goal on 17 May 2015, netting the last in a 1–1 home draw against Real Zaragoza.

On 28 August 2015, Mas signed a new one-year deal with the club, after already being a regular member of the first team. On 31 January 2017, after making no appearances during the first half of the campaign, he was loaned to CF Gavà until June.

On 17 June 2017, after Girona's promotion to La Liga, Mas was released and he joined UE Olot ten days later.

References

External links

1993 births
Living people
People from Pla de l'Estany
Sportspeople from the Province of Girona
Spanish footballers
Footballers from Catalonia
Association football defenders
Segunda División players
Segunda División B players
Girona FC B players
Girona FC players
CF Gavà players
UE Olot players